Diaspididae is the largest family of scale insects with over 2650 described species in around 400 genera. As with all scale insects, the female produces a waxy protective scale beneath which it feeds on its host plant. Diaspidid scales are far more substantial than those of most other families, incorporating the exuviae from the first two nymphal instars and sometimes faecal matter and fragments of the host plant. These can be complex and extremely waterproof structures rather resembling a suit of armor. For this reason these insects are commonly referred to as armored scale insects. As it is so robust and firmly attached to the host plant, the scale often persists long after the insect has died.

Some African Diaspididae are attended by ants of genus Melissotarsus. The ants appear to consume the armored scales because Diaspididae are completely naked when ant-attended; the ant nest itself remains completely hidden under the bark of the tree.

Selected species
Well-known species include:

 Abgrallaspis cyanophylli, the cyanophyllum scale
 Aonidiella aurantii, the California red scale
 Aonidomytilus crookiae the St. John's Wort Scale
 Aulacaspis yasumatsui, the cycad aulacaspis scale
 Carulaspis minima, the minute cypress scale
 Diaspidiotus perniciosus, the San Jose scale
 Hemiberlesia lataniae, the latania or palm scale
 Lepidosaphes beckii, the citrus mussel scale
 Lepidosaphes ulmi, the oystershell scale
 Quadraspidiotus juglansregiae, the walnut scale

Genera

References

External links
 Diaspididae at ScaleNet
Aulacaspis yasumatsui, cycad aulacaspis scale 
Comstockiella sabalis, palmetto scale
Diaspis boisduvalii,  boisduval scale
Fiorinia theae, tea scale
Ischnaspis longirostris, black thread scale
Pseudaulacaspis cockerelli, false oleander scale 
Pseudaulacaspis pentagona, white peach scale 

 
Scale insects
Hemiptera families
Neococcoids